ERG3 or sterol C-5 desaturase is a fungal enzyme originally from Saccharomyces cerevisiae, the human ortholog of ERG3 is SC5D. ERG3 localizes to both the endoplasmic reticulum and vesicles, catalyzes the C5(6)-dehydrogenation of episterol to 5-dehydroepisterol, 5-Dehydroepisterol will be further converted into ergosterol.

See also
 C-5 sterol desaturase
 Δ7-sterol 5(6)-desaturase

References 

EC 1.14.19
Saccharomyces cerevisiae genes